Juan Francisco Giró (3 June 1791, Montevideo – 8 May 1863) was a Uruguayan politician and the President of Uruguay from 1852 until 1853.

He was deposed by a military mutiny in September 1853 by one of the Colorado party.

See also
 History of Uruguay

1791 births
1863 deaths
People from Montevideo
Uruguayan people of Catalan descent
National Party (Uruguay) politicians
Presidents of Uruguay
19th-century Uruguayan people